Rho Centauri, Latinized from ρ Centauri, is a binary star system in the southern constellation of  Centaurus. It is visible to the naked eye as a blue-white hued point of light with a combined apparent visual magnitude of +3.97. The system is located approximately 276 light years from the Sun based on parallax, and is drifting further away with a radial velocity of around +15 km/s. It is a proper motion member of the Lower Centaurus–Crux sub-group in the Scorpius–Centaurus OB association, the nearest such association of co-moving massive stars to the Sun.

The primary component of this system is a B-type main-sequence star with a stellar classification of B3 V. It is about 24 million years old with a high rate of spin, showing a projected rotational velocity of 147 km/s. It has 6.6 times the mass of the Sun and 3.8 times the Sun's radius. The star is radiating 810 times the luminosity of the Sun from its photosphere at an effective temperature of 19,500 K.

The secondary companion is 1.1 magnitudes fainter than the primary, with a projected separation of  along a position angle of 19.72°, as of 2013.

References

B-type main-sequence stars
Spectroscopic binaries
Lower Centaurus Crux

Centaurus (constellation)
Centauri, Rho
Durchmusterung objects
105937
059449
4638